The 1954 Alexander Cup was the Canadian national major ('open' to both amateur and professional leagues) senior ice hockey championship for the 1953–54 season.

The Maritime Major Hockey League (MMHL) was the only major league left in Canada, so its winner, the Halifax Atlantics were awarded the Alexander Cup.

External links
 Hockey Canada
 MMHL Seasons at hockeydb.com

Alex